Lord Robertson may refer to:

Patrick Robertson, Lord Robertson (1794–1855), Scottish judge
James Robertson, Baron Robertson (1845–1909)
George Robertson, Baron Robertson of Port Ellen (born 1946)
Ian Robertson, Lord Robertson (1912–2005) TD, Senator of the College of Justice in Scotland, 1966–1987, chairman of the Merchiston Board of governors, 1970–1996

See also
Lord Roberts (disambiguation)